Michael Shulman may refer to:
 Michael Shulman (actor), American film, stage, and television actor
 Michael Shulman (writer) (born 1973), American writer
 Michael Shulman (mathematician), associate professor of mathematics at the University of San Diego

See also
 Michael Schulman, American sports executive